Evergestis caesialis is a species of moth in the family Crambidae. It is found in Italy, Croatia, Bosnia and Herzegovina, Romania, Bulgaria, the Republic of Macedonia, Greece, Iran and North Africa, including Morocco.

The wingspan is 19–24 mm. In Europe, adults are on wing in August and in Morocco from mid-June to the end of July.

Subspecies
Evergestis caesialis caesialis
Evergestis caesialis comealis Amsel, 1961 (Iran)
Evergestis caesialis mellealis Zerny, 1936 (North Africa)

References

Moths described in 1849
Evergestis
Moths of Europe
Moths of Asia
Moths of Africa